Crassispira semicolon is an extinct species of sea snail, a marine gastropod mollusk in the family Pseudomelatomidae, the turrids and allies.

Subspecies: † Crassispira semicolon chameryensis (de Boury, 1899) (synonym: † Pleurotoma chameryensis de Boury, 1899)

Description
The length of the shell attains 24.6 mm; its diameter 8.3 mm.

Distribution
Fossils have been found in Pliocene and Middle Eocene strata off Norfolk, Great Britain; also in the Paris Basin and the Loire Basin, France

References

 G.B. Sowerby I (1812-1822), The mineral conchology of Great Britain 1-4 (1-66), 793 pp. pls. 1-383
 Tracey, S. and Jonathan A. Todd. "Nomenclatural changes for some Bracklesham Group gastropods." Tertiary Research 16 (1996): 41-54.

External links
 Fossilworks : Crassispira semicolon

semicolon
Gastropods described in 1816